Breitenbach may refer to:

Places

Austria
Breitenbach am Inn, a municipality in Tyrol

Czech Republic
The former name of Potůčky

France
Breitenbach, Bas-Rhin, a commune in the Bas-Rhin département 
Breitenbach-Haut-Rhin, a commune in the Haut-Rhin département

Germany
, part of Ebermannstadt, Bavaria
Breitenbach am Herzberg, a municipality in the Hersfeld-Rotenburg district, Hesse
, part of Schauenburg, Hesse
, part of Schlüchtern, Hesse
, part of Bebra, Hesse
Breitenbach, Rhineland-Palatinate, a municipality in the Kusel district, Rhineland-Palatinate 
Breitenbach, Burgenlandkreis, a village in the Burgenlandkreis district, Saxony-Anhalt
Breitenbach (archaeological site) near Breitenbach, Burgenlandkreis
, part of Sangerhausen in the Mansfeld-Südharz district, Saxony-Anhalt
, part of Leinefelde-Worbis in Eichsfeld district, Thuringia

Switzerland
Breitenbach, Switzerland, a municipality in the canton of Solothurn

Rivers in Germany 
Breitenbach (Echaz), a tributary of the Echaz in Baden-Württemberg
Breitenbach (Erle), a tributary of the Erle in Thuringia
Breitenbach (Speyerbach), tributary of the Speyerbach in Rhineland-Palatinate
Breitenbach (Tegernsee), a tributary of the Tegernsee in Bavariy

People with the surname 
 Albert von Breitenbach, birth name of Tin Pan Alley composer Fred Fisher (1875–1942)
 Anna Breitenbach (born 1952), German writer and performance artist
 Josef Breitenbach, German/American photographer
 Petrus Breitenbach, South African lawn bowler
 T. E. Breitenbach, American artist

See also
 Breytenbach (disambiguation)

German toponymic surnames